Consuelo, comtesse de Saint-Exupéry (née Suncín de Sandoval; 10 April 1901 – 28 May 1979), was a Salvadoran-French writer and artist, and was married to the French aristocrat, writer and pioneering aviator Antoine de Saint-Exupéry.

Early life
Born Consuelo Suncín de Sandoval as the daughter of a rich coffee grower and army reservist, she grew up in a family of wealthy landowners in a small town in the Salvadoran department of Sonsonate. Due to her asthma, her father sent her abroad to the United States, where she studied in San Francisco; later she studied in Mexico City, and also in France.

Personal life
Her first marriage was to a Mexican army captain, Ricardo Cárdenas, whom she met in the United States. Though this marriage ended in divorce, she lied and said it ended with his death during the Mexican Revolution, since divorced women were then stigmatized by society, and being a widow was preferable to being a divorced woman. While in France, she met and later married Enrique Gómez Carrillo, a Guatemalan writer, diplomat and journalist. Following his death in 1927, she took up residence in Buenos Aires.

In 1931 in Buenos Aires, she met and married the French aristocrat, writer and pioneering aviator Count Antoine de Saint-Exupéry, making her a countess. At the time Consuelo was a once-divorced, once-widowed Salvadoran writer and artist who possessed a bohemian spirit and was known as a mischief-maker. Saint-Exupéry, thoroughly enchanted by the diminutive woman, would leave and then return to her many times; she was both his muse and over the long term the source of much of his angst. It was a stormy union, with Saint-Exupéry travelling frequently and indulging in numerous extramarital affairs, most notably with the Frenchwoman Hélène de Vogüé (1908–2003), known as 'Nelly' and referred to as "Madame de B." in Saint-Exupéry biographies. Hélène (Nelly) de Vogüé (1908–2003), born Hélène Jaunez to a French businessman, became a well-known French business executive and also an intellectual fluent in several languages. She married the equally well-known French noble Jean de Vogüé in 1927 and had one child with him, Patrice. Hélène is referred to only as "Madame de B." in multiple Saint-Exupéry biographies. This occurred due to agreements she made with writers before granting them access to her troves of the author-aviator's writings, which will not be released from the French national archives until 2053 after she deposited them there. It is believed she sought her anonymity in order to protect Saint-Exupéry's reputation, as during the Second World War, the U.S. O.S.S. suspected she was a secret Vichy agent and Nazi collaborator.

Career
Consuelo also had numerous extramarital affairs. Following the disappearance of her husband in July 1944, with her loss of Saint-Exupéry still fresh, she purportedly wrote a memoir of their life together, The Tale of the Rose, which was sealed away in a trunk in her home. Two decades after her death in 1979, the manuscript came to light when José Martinez-Fructuoso, her heir and long-time employee, and his wife, Martine, discovered it in an attic trunk. Alain Vircondelet, author of a biography of Antoine de Saint-Exupéry, edited it, improving her French and dividing it into chapters. Its publication in France in 2000, one century after Antoine de Saint-Exupéry's birth on 29 June 1900, became a national sensation. As of 2011 it had been translated into sixteen languages.

Death
Consuelo died on 28 May 1979 and is buried in Père Lachaise Cemetery in Paris, alongside her second husband Enrique Carrillo.

Portrayal in The Little Prince

Despite their tumultuous relationship, Antoine kept Consuelo close to his heart. Consuelo, who suffered from asthma, is the likely inspiration for the major character in The Little Prince, the prince's petulant, vain, but fragile 'flower', identified as The Rose, whom he protects under glass and with a windscreen on his tiny planet which is named Asteroid B-612.

Saint-Exupéry's infidelity and doubts about his marriage are symbolised by the field of roses the Prince encounters during his visit to Earth. In the novella, The Fox tells The Prince that his Rose is unique and special, because she is the one whom he loves.

The Prince's home asteroid also possesses three tiny volcanoes, likely inspired by the three volcanoes in the Cordillera de Apaneca volcanic range complex, which are directly visible from Consuelo's home town of Armenia, El Salvador. Consuelo's home country is also known as the "Land of Volcanoes". The two active volcanoes were inspired by the Santa Ana Volcano and the famous conical-shaped Izalco, which was likely spewing ash and lava when Antoine visited El Salvador. The dormant volcano is Cerro Verde.

Honours
Antoine's 1939 memoir, Wind, Sand and Stars (Terre des hommes), was employed to create the central theme—Terre des hommes/Man and his world—of the 1967 International World's Fair in Montreal, Canada, Expo 67. The Countess de Saint Exupéry, Consuelo, was a guest of honour at the official opening ceremonies of the world's fair.

Popular culture
Actress Janet Waldo was the voice for The Rose in the animated TV series "The Adventures of the Little Prince". Singer Máiréad Carlin played The Rose in The Little Prince musical.
Consuelo's relationship with Antoine was portrayed by Miranda Richardson and Bruno Ganz in the 1996 biopic Saint-Ex. The film combines elements of biography, documentary, and dramatic re-creation. Consuelo is also a major character in the forthcoming historical novel Studio Saint-Ex by Ania Szado. The book examines Consuelo and Antoine's time in New York City during World War II while Antoine is writing The Little Prince.

References
 Footnotes

 Citations

 Bibliography

 Commire, Anne. Something about the Author in Volume 20 of Something about the Author: Facts and Pictures about Contemporary Authors and Illustrators of Books for Young People, Gale Research Company, 1980, 
 
 Saint-Exupéry, Consuelo de; Allen, Esther (translator) The Tale of the Rose: The Love Story Behind The Little Prince, New York: Random House, 2000, .

Further reading

External links
 A biography of Consuelo de Saint Exupéry
 A website dedicated to Mme Consuelo de Saint.Exupéry

1901 births
1979 deaths
Deaths from asthma
Antoine de Saint-Exupéry
Burials at Père Lachaise Cemetery
French countesses
French memoirists
People from Sonsonate Department
Salvadoran artists
Salvadoran people of indigenous peoples descent
Salvadoran women writers
20th-century memoirists
20th-century French women writers